The Beaver Dam Wash is a seasonal stream near the southwestern Utah-Nevada border in the United States. At its southern end in northern Arizona, near the point where it empties into the Virgin River, the stream flows throughout the year. Part of the wash is in the Beaver Dam Wash National Conservation Area, managed by the Bureau of Land Management. The wash was so named on account of beaver dams which once were built on its course.

The wash occupies a transition zone among the Colorado Plateau, the Great Basin, and the Mojave Desert ecosystems.  Like all such zones, this area supports diverse vegetative communities and a rich array of wildlife.  The wash begins in the Clover Mountains in Lincoln County, Nevada and flows south across very sparsely populated desert terrain. The area around the wash, including several protected wilderness areas, includes forests of Joshua trees along with other yuccas, cholla cactus, barrel cactus, Mormon Tea, and other grasses and shrubs, the primary vegetation in the area.

Animal life in the area consists of a variety of lizards, mammals, birds, insects, and other creatures found in the Mojave Desert.  The lower elevations provide designated critical habitat for the threatened desert tortoise and other native species, such as desert bighorn sheep, gila monster, and mojave rattlesnake.

Winters are mild, with temperatures reaching highs from the mid-50s to 60s degrees Fahrenheit.  Winter lows are usually in the 40s to high 20s Fahrenheit. Summer highs are commonly over 100 degrees Fahrenheit with lows in the mid-80s Fahrenheit.

Flash floods are common in the area when heavy summer monsoon thunderstorms dump heavy amounts of rain in short times, causing water to fill washes and gulleys in the area.  Most precipitation comes in concentrated storms that are infrequent. Generally, the air is low in humidity and dry. Windy conditions also are common throughout the year.

At  elevation, Beaver Dam Wash is the lowest point in the state of Utah.

See also
List of rivers of Utah
Beaver Dam State Park
Beaver Dam Mountains Wilderness
Doc's Pass Wilderness
Slaughter Creek Wilderness
Cougar Canyon Wilderness

References

External links
Map of Beaver Dam Wash NCA in Utah
Map of wilderness areas in northwestern Washington County, Utah

Lowest points of U.S. states
Rivers of Mohave County, Arizona
Rivers of Utah
Rivers of Washington County, Utah
Tributaries of the Colorado River in Arizona
Tributaries of the Colorado River in Utah
Tributaries of the Lower Colorado River in Arizona
Washes of Arizona